This is a list of all roster changes that occurred prior to the 2017–18 Indian Super League season.

Retained players
Due to the league expanding with two new teams, each Indian Super League club is allowed to retain a maximum of two Indian players over the age of twenty-one (21).

Atlético de Kolkata

Bengaluru FC

Chennaiyin FC

Delhi Dynamos
On 7 July 2017, the Delhi Dynamos stated that they would not retain any of their domestic players from the previous season.

FC Goa

Kerala Blasters FC

Mumbai City FC

Northeast United FC

Pune City

ISL Players Draft

Player movement and other transactions

References

2017–18 Indian Super League season
Lists of Indian Super League transfers
2017–18 in Indian football
India